Carlos Alberto Ficicchia Gigliotti  (born March 27, 1963), known by his stage name Charly Alberti, is an Argentine rock musician, best known as the drummer of the influential Argentine rock band Soda Stereo. Because of this, he is considered one of the most important musicians of Latin and Spanish rock. He is the oldest son of Dolly Gigliotti and Argentine jazz drummer Tito Alberti.

Biography

General
He wanted to be a pilot, but he couldn't make it because of his color blindness. Unlike his friends, he was never attracted by football and he preferred water polo and hockey instead, which he used to practice at River Plate, a few blocks away from his home. He started to practice drums driven by his father Tito Alberti. By 1981, Charly met the two men who became his bandmates for 15 years: Gustavo Cerati and Hector "Zeta" Bosio, together they formed Soda Stereo, one of the most prominent and influential Argentine rock bands of the last two decades.

Soda Stereo recorded their first album by 1983, and reached fame by 1985 with their second album "Nada Personal" (Nothing personal), which became number 1 in charts in such countries as Argentina, Peru, Chile, Mexico, Colombia and Venezuela. By 1987, Charly Alberti met Remo Belli, the CEO of Remo Drums, who decided to sponsor him as one of his top 5 drummers in the world; this relationship became not only professional but personal as well. Also, in 1987, Soda Stereo made a tour for Latin America that took them to Uruguay, Chile, Paraguay, Peru, Bolivia, Ecuador, Colombia, Mexico, Venezuela, and of course, Argentina. There were 57 concerts in 41 cities and 300.000 people attended.

By 1987, Alberti was named by several music experts as one of the most prominent drummers in Argentina and Latin America. In 1988, Alberti was featured in the December issue of Modern Drummer magazine. In 1995 he was named the best Argentine drummer of that year by the AAM (Asociación Argentina de Música - Argentine Music Association)

Soda Stereo then recorded "Signos" (Signs -1986), "Doble Vida" (Double life -1988), "Canción Animal" (Animal Song- 1990), "Dynamo" (1992) and "Sueño Stereo" (Stereo Dream-1995). In 1995, during an impasse of Soda Stereo that lasted 2 years, Alberti decided to make an album with his then girlfriend, Argentine supermodel Deborah del Corral; the project was named PLUM and edited an album that was released only in Argentina. By 1997, Soda Stereo got back together only to do a farewell mini tour that ended on Sep. 20th 1997 in Argentina.

In 2007, 10 years after their last concert, Soda Stereo reunited for a tour that started on Oct.19th and finished on Dec. 21st. The tour was called "Me verás volver" (You'll see me coming back) and took them to Mexico, Peru, Panama, Colombia, Ecuador, USA, Argentina and Venezuela. In total, they gave 22 concerts and sold out in every location they went. Soda Stereo made 6 gigs in the Monumental Stadium of River Plate(Argentina) and broke the record that was held by The Rolling Stones in that country with 5 sold-out gigs in the same place. Each night they called around 60.000 people. After the tour, Gustavo Cerati, Zeta Bosio and Charly Alberti, came back to their solo careers.

Life after Soda Stereo
In 1996, Charly Alberti founded CybeRelations, a company dedicated to promote Apple Macintosh in Argentina. By 1997, Charly decided to expand the company's objectives and started developing applications for multimedia and Internet, mainly for the Hispanic market. By the end of that year, Alberti became one of the AppleMasters, the only Latin American in the group.

By 1998, Charly created the i-time, which was accepted and used as the new standard of time on the Internet. By the end of that year, he launched URL Magazine and URL Records, both projects dedicated to promote electronic music in Latin countries. In 1999, Cybrel launched yeyeye.com, a web site dedicated to promote music in Latin America. In July 2001, Charly received an invitation of the Spanish Crown to talk in a conference about the importance of the Spanish language on the Internet and technology in general.

In 2003 Charly Alberti received an invitation from MTV Latin America to participate in a special performance for the Second Edition of the MTV Latin American Video Awards. The idea was to put together an "All Star band" of Latin American musicians that was to be the biggest surprise of the evening. This experience left Charly with the desire to go back into music. After that, he returned to Argentina and by 2005, founded along with his brother Andrés, a new rock band: MOLE. The band members are: Charly Alberti (drums), Andrés Alberti (lead guitars), Sergio Bufi (singer and second guitar) and Ezequial Dasso (chorus and bass). The group released their first album in April 2007, simply titled MOLE; it was iniatilly released only in Argentina and then later to the rest of Latin America. On March 26, 2008, MOLE won in the category of Best Album by a New Rock Band in the Gardel Awards.

Alberti lost his father, Latin jazz drummer Tito Alberti, on March 25, 2009. He joined The Climate Project, the foundation led by Nobel laureate Al Gore, as its chief spokesman in Argentina on May 1.

In 2017, Alberti was named the U.N. Development Program Goodwill Ambassador.

Instruments 

Since the beginning of his career, Charly used  Remo drumheads and Zildjian cymbals.

Since mid-2007, Charly Alberti has been using a Yamaha drum, breaking with its tradition of using brand Remo drums. However, Charly explained this by saying that Yamaha now provides a rock sound and Remo are now spending more on drums for Jazz, this decision was made in conjunction Charly and Remo Belli, founder of Remo.

References

External links

  Charly Alberti's official MySpace
  MOLE's official MySpace
 Soda Stereo official website

1963 births
Living people
Soda Stereo members
Argentine drummers
Male drummers
Argentine environmentalists
Argentine people of Italian descent
Argentine people of Sicilian descent
Musicians from Buenos Aires